The 2022–23 Rugby Europe International Championships is the European Championship for tier 2 and tier 3 rugby union nations. The 2022–23 season is the first of its new format and structure.

On February 28, 2022, Russia and Belarus were suspended from all international rugby and cross-border club rugby activities until further notice.

Countries
Pre-tournament World Rugby rankings in parentheses.

Championship
Group A
  * (13)  
  ↑ (30)            
    (28)
    (15)

Trophy 
  ↑ (39)
    (48)
    (34)
  ↑ (37)
    (35)

Group B
  ↑ (26)
  ↑ (29)
    (20)
    (17)

Conference 1
North
    (36)
    (64)
    (63)
    (61)
  ↑ (56)

Conference 2
North
    (86)
    (71)
    (83)
    (100)

Development
  ↓ (87)
  (NR)

South
  ↑ (66)
    (NR)
    (59)
    (41)
    (76)

South
    (89)
  ↑ (NR)
    (79)
    (NR)

Legend:*Champion of 2021–22 season; ↑ Promoted from lower division during 2021–22 season; • Division Champion but not promoted during 2021–22 season; ‡ Last place inside own division but not relegated during 2021–22; ↓ Relegated from higher division during 2021–22 season

2023 Rugby Europe Championship

<onlyinclude>{| class="wikitable collapsible collapsed" style="width:100%"
|-
!Matches
|-
| style="text-align:center"|Group Stage
|-
|

|-
| style="text-align:center"|Semi-Finals
|-
|

|-
| style="text-align:center"|Ranking Finals
|-
|

Seventh Place Final

Fifth Place Final 

|-
| style="text-align:center"|Grand Finals
|-
|

Bronze Final

Grand Final 

|}

2022–23 Rugby Europe Trophy

2022–23 Rugby Europe Conference

Conference 1

Conference 1 North

Conference 1 South

Conference 2

Conference 2 North

Conference 2 South

2023 Rugby Europe  Development

References

2022–23 Rugby Europe International Championships
2022-23
2022–23 in European rugby union
Europe
Europe
Rugby Europe